Puvunga (alternate spellings: Puvungna or Povuu'nga) is an ancient village and sacred site of the Tongva nation, the Indigenous people of the Los Angeles Basin, and the Acjachemen, the Indigenous people of Orange County now located at California State University, Long Beach and the surrounding area. The Tongva know Puvunga as the "place of emergence" and it is where they believed "their world and their lives began." The site remains an important ceremonial site and ending to an annual pilgrimage for the Tongva, Acjachemen, and Chumash.

Before the arrival of European settlers, Puvunga extended far beyond the contemporary location or site that remains. Its presence was first uncovered in 1952 and then in 1974 at the designated location when trenching was done for the Earl Burns Miller Japanese Garden. The site was listed on the National Register of Historic Places. In 1992, the university challenged its historic designation and threatened force in order to build a strip mall on the site, which was blocked by direct action and intervention by the ACLU. In 2019, dirt and trash were dumped on the site by the university.

The site is located near the Japanese Garden along the banks of a now channelized creek, about three miles (5 km) from the Pacific Ocean. The site is not marked with a sign or other informational marker on its significance. It remains a natural area located at the edge of campus near a parking lot. There was a natural spring located a short distance from the Rancho Alamitos building that flowed until 1956 referred to as Puvunga Spring. Another similar (but larger) Tongva site is Kuruvungna Springs on the grounds of University High School in Los Angeles.

Etymology 
Puvunga can be taken to mean "the place of the gathering" or "in the ball," depending on the source.

Significance 
The site has been listed on the National Register of Historic Places since 1974 for its historical and cultural significance. It remains a ceremonial site for the Acjachemen, Tongva, and Chumash for intertribal gatherings and as the ending of an annual pilgrimage that begins at the village site of Panhe, now located in San Onofre.

The village is remembered by the Tongva and Acjachemen as home to Wiyot, one of the First Beings who was their sacred leader. It is "the place of emergence" or where "their world and their lives began." In Tongva traditional narratives it is also, a few centuries later, the birthplace of Chingishnish, "the prophet or deity who appears at Puvunga after Wiyot, the creator, has been killed, and tells the assembly what they must do in order to feed themselves."

Rare bird species have been identified on the site by the Audubon Society.

History

Prosperous village 

Puvunga once stood on a rounded knoll or small hill above the expansive wetlands, now known as the Los Cerritos Wetlands, of the San Gabriel River. The Pacific Ocean, now pushed several miles west by settlers and commercial development, came all the way to the bluff of the village.

Puvunga was a large village that extended far beyond the remaining area associated with the village. It was a major regional trading and ceremonial center for the Tongva and Acjachemen. Villagers used te'aats to travel out to villages on Pimu (Santa Catalina Island) and other islands off the coast, now referred to as the Channel Islands, a journey of cultural importance.

Nearby coastal villages included the very close settlement of Motuucheyngna (Seal Beach), now sometimes referred to in archaeological terms as Puvungna East, Guashna (now at Playa Vista) located about twenty miles up the coast, and the village of Lupukngna, located down the coastline at the mouth of the Santa Ana River.

Colonization 

Like many other Tongva villages in the greater Los Angeles Basin area, village life at Puvunga deteriorated immensely with the arrival of Spanish missionaries and soldiers.

With the establishment of Mission San Gabriel in 1771, many people from surrounding villages were brought to the mission for conversion and as a labor force to work the grounds of the mission in conditions that were recognized as slavery by third-party observers at the time. Between 1785 and 1805, mission records noted numerous baptisms of villagers from Puvunga, indicating that the village was likely depleted shortly after.

In 1822, Geronimo Boscana referred to the village as Pubuna and located it within the Spanish land grant Rancho de los Nietos established in 1784, which was eight leagues northwest of Mission San Juan Capistrano.

Many of the villagers likely died at the mission and many did not survive the mission period. At Mission San Gabriel, there were a total of 7,854 baptisms (2,459 children) and 5,656 deaths (2,916 children) until secularization in 1834, indicating a very high rate of death. Children often died very young at the missions. One missionary at Mission San Gabriel reported that three out of every four children born died before reaching the age of two.

In 1844, Hugo Reid referred to the village as Pubugna and stated it could still be identified as existing at Rancho Los Alamitos, which was a subdivision of Rancho de los Nietos.

John Peabody Harrington identified the presence of shell middens in the Rancho Los Alamitos area. At this time, Harrington consulted three Indigenous informants, Jose de Los Santos Juncos, José de Grácia Cruz, and a "very old informant" Guorojos who each referred to the site as the village, referred to as Puvu'na and Puvu, as being in Los Alamitos. Harrington's report of these events was published in 1933.

1952 excavation 
The first awareness of the village's presence to most Long Beach residents occurred in 1952. On Christmas Eve of that year, a burial site of Puvunga was discovered about a mile north of the California State University, Long Beach campus, then referred to as Long Beach State College when workers of the L. S. Whaley Company uncovered two dozen ancestral remains and funerary objects in the construction of a housing development. In 1952, an article for the Long Beach Press-Telegram wrote that the "ruins might be part of Pubunga an ancient 'holy city.'"

In 1955, it was noted by Helen Smith Giffen that there were "shell debris littering the fields below the [Los Alamitos] ranch house bear witness to the fact that this was once the site of an Indian rancheria [Puvunga]." She noted that there was still a "wonderful spring" which flowed at the location at this time.

1974 historic designation 

In 1972, campus workmen uncovered portions of a burial at LAn-235, located on the western edge of campus. Funding for the 1973 excavation was provided by the City of Long Beach, Long Beach Historical Society, Rancho Los Alamitos Associates, and private donors. Tongva remnants unearthed included arrowheads and shards of pottery in a style called Cerritos Brown ware. These remains were placed in CSULB's archaeology lab.

A shopping center and apartments at 7th Street and Pacific Coast Highway, Long Beach Veterans Administration Hospital, Rancho Los Alamitos and the college now stand atop the historic settlement “near the present-day mouth of the San Gabriel River and the Cerritos Channel.”

In 1974, LAn-235 was placed on the National Register of Historic Places to represent Puvungna "as a means of perpetuating the memory of these native peoples and their religion, and as an aid to the program of public education." Two other sites were included in the National Register: the adjacent LAn-234 and LAn-306, located just east of campus on the grounds of the historic Rancho Los Alamitos.

In 1979, a reburial of an individual who was disinterred in 1972 occurred. After this reburial, campus workmen erected a small engraved wooden sign at the site which read "Gabrieleno Indians once inhabited this site, Puvunga, birthplace of Chungicnish, law-giver and god."

1992 strip mall threat 
Despite its known importance, in 1992, the university attempted to challenge Puvunga's designation as a historic site in order to construct a strip mall on the remaining site of Puvunga as well as a nearby organic community garden that had been established on the first Earth Day. When gardeners organized to prevent a development of a parking lot for the strip mall site, campus officials ignored them and moved forward with development, claiming that there were "no cultural resources" on site.

In response, the Tongva and others organized to stop the development in order to save the site from destruction. They initiated protests and filed a lawsuit that temporarily stalled any construction. The university's sudden hostile attitude toward the preservation of the site has been credited to a change in the university's leadership and the decline in California state support for public education, which has pushed universities to find economic revenue sources "to replace state support for higher education that has drastically eroded in the last two decades."

As a result, direct action was initiated to prevent the development of the site. Tents were pitched and a prayer vigil was performed. In response, the university built a fence around the area and ordered that they leave the site with threat of arrest. This prompted the American Civil Liberties Union (ACLU) to get involved, who filed a preliminary injunction against the university. Raleigh Levine of the ACLU stated: "This case is about the First Amendment rights of the Native Americans to whom Puvungna is sacred. They have the right to freely exercise their beliefs without the state stepping in to pave over their place of worship and put a mini-mall on it."

A short film of the event "Sacred Lands, White Man's Laws" was made available in 1994.

2000 burial disturbance 
A burial site in the greater Puvunga area was disturbed in the construction of the neighborhood of Hellman Ranch in the adjacent city of Seal Beach. The site is sometimes archaeologically referred to as Puvungna East or as the village of Motuucheyngna, because of its close proximity to Puvugna and in acknowledgment of the large area the village once comprised. About 35 bodies were disturbed in the development of Hellman Ranch along with numerous artifacts of the Tongva.

2019 dumping 
In 2019, CSULB received backlash after dumping dirt and trash on the site. Local Indigenous groups, such as the Juaneño Band of Mission Indians, Acjachemen Nation were not consulted in regard to the dumping. This resulted in a legal challenge by the tribe which halted the dumping in October 2019. However, the legal proceedings were stalled as a result of the COVID-19 pandemic and CSULB had yet to remove the dirt and trash by May 2020. Chairman of the tribe Matias Belardes commented on how the dumping reflected a shift in attitude from the university since the 1992 lawsuit:We’ve had a decent relationship since then [the 1992 incident when CSULB attempted to build a strip mall on the site] ... [We] find it disrespectful and disheartening. Ever since that lawsuit, it was thought that there would be a better understanding of what that site means to us. Somewhere along the way there’s been a disconnect. Now we’re back to square one after all these positive things that have come from the original lawsuit all those years ago. We thought we were past it already. It shouldn’t have come to this. The university should know the significance of the site, what it means to the tribes and what you can and can’t do on the property.In response, six departments at CSULB are developing a film and educational resources to teach the campus community about the significance of the site in an attempt to prevent future damage.

See also 
Genga
Kuruvunga Springs
Puhú
Tongva
Yaanga
Population of Native California
Native Americans in the United States

References

External links 
The California Cultural Resources Preservation Alliance Inc. (CCRPA)
Puvungna web page maintained by Prof. Eugene Ruyle
CSULB 49er article on Puvunga (February 2006)
"Native American tribes continue to fight to protect parcel of land on CSULB campus" (2020)

Tongva
Tongva populated places
Archaeological sites in California
California State University, Long Beach
Historic districts on the National Register of Historic Places in California
History of Long Beach, California
History of Los Angeles County, California
Religious places of the indigenous peoples of North America
Properties of religious function on the National Register of Historic Places in California
National Register of Historic Places in Los Angeles County, California
Populated places on the National Register of Historic Places in California